July 7 is a 2016 Sri Lankan Sinhala comedy black-n-white film directed by Sanjaya Nirmal and produced by Charith Abeysinghe for Head Master Films. The film based on a miniplay of Don't Dress for Dinner by French Marc Camoletti (playwright). Music composed by Nuwan Thenuwara. It is the 1248th Sri Lankan film in the Sinhala cinema.

Plot

Cast
The characters are from their real life names.

 Anarkali Akarsha as Susina
 Saranga Disasekara as Tom
 Charith Abeysinge as Robbin
 Damitha Abeyratne as Susima
 Pubudu Chathuranga as Kalu Malli
 Oshadi Hewamadduda as Loren

Soundtrack

References

2016 films
Sinhala-language films